Geoffrey Tedstone (born 19 January 1961) is a former English cricketer. He played for Warwickshire between 1982 and 1988 and for Gloucestershire between 1989 and 1990.

References

External links

1961 births
Living people
English cricketers
Gloucestershire cricketers
Warwickshire cricketers
Sportspeople from Southport
Wicket-keepers